The Netherlands national cricket team toured South Africa from January to February 1997 and played seven limited overs matches against teams representing various areas of South Africa. The touring Dutch team was captained by Tim de Leede.

Matches

References

1997 in Dutch cricket
1997 in South African cricket
South Africa